is a Japanese manga artist. She debuted in 2000 with a one-shot in Akamaru Jump before publishing a full series in Monthly Shōnen Sirius. Following that series completion, she launched Blue Exorcist in Jump Square.

Biography
Kazue Kato was born on July 20, 1980 in Tokyo. She has two younger siblings, a brother and a sister. In high school, she had aspirations to be an animator. However, her dad did not feel she was serious enough about it, so he sent her to college. However, she left college and decided to become a manga artist instead. After publishing several one-shots, she made her first full series, Robo to Usakichi. It was serialized in Monthly Shōnen Sirius from 2005 to 2007.

Following Robo to Usakichis completion, she was approached by the editorial department of Jump Square to serialize a manga in the magazine. She eventually developed Blue Exorcist, which started serialization in Jump Square on April 4, 2009. The seventh volume of the series had an initial print run of one million copies; the series was the first manga in Jump Square to achieve such a feat. In the first half of 2017, the series was the eleventh best selling manga in Japan. The series has also been given numerous adaptations, including an anime series that ran for two seasons and a film.

In 2020, she did the character designs for the Godzilla Singular Point television series. In July 2021, she announced Blue Exorcist would be put on hiatus so she could launch a manga adaptation of Fuyumi Ono's Eizen Karukaya Kaiitan novel series.

Influences
Kato has cited Kentaro Miura's Berserk as a major influence over her work, specifically the relationship between Guts, Griffith, and Casca.

Works

Manga
  (2000) (one-shot published in Akamaru Jump)
  (2005–2007) (serialized in Monthly Shōnen Sirius)
  (2009–present) (serialized in Jump Square)
  (2021–2022) (adaptation of the novel series by Fuyumi Ono, serialized in Jump Square)

Other
  (2021) (character designs)

References

External links
Official website 
 

1980 births
Living people
Manga artists from Tokyo
Women manga artists